Droužetice is a municipality and village in Strakonice District in the South Bohemian Region of the Czech Republic. It has about 100 inhabitants.

Administrative parts
The village of Černíkov is an administrative part of Droužetice.

References

Villages in Strakonice District